Events in the year 2007 in Namibia.

Incumbents 

 President: Hifikepunye Pohamba
 Prime Minister: Nahas Angula
 Chief Justice of Namibia: Peter Shivute

Events 

 5 – 16 June – The country participated in the 2007 IRB Nations Cup.

Deaths

References 

 
2000s in Namibia
Years of the 21st century in Namibia
Namibia
Namibia